INS Satavahana is the premier Submarine Training Base of the Indian Navy and is located at Visakhapatnam, Andhra Pradesh. Training is carried out by the Submarine School (SMS) and the Escape Training School (ETS) and the School of Advanced Undersea Warfare (SAUW).

History 
The unit was originally an integrated training establishment set up on 11 March 1974 for the purpose of training officers and sailors for ships and submarines of Soviet origin. The establishment was later named INS Satavahana and commissioned on 21 December 1974. In 1986 it was decided to disband the surface training school and convert INS Satavahana to an exclusive submarine training establishment.

School of Advanced Undersea Warfare (SAUW) was established in Dec 2006 inside the premises of INS Satavahana, to train the crew of submarines of the nuclear submarines. The training for the Kalvari Class submarines the P 75 (I) class of submarines is also being set up here.

Objective 
The primary role of this establishment is to impart world class submarine and escape training to meet the stringent performance objectives and exacting standards of the Submarine Arm. It is the only integrated training establishment in the Indian Navy, as it carries out training for all branches of officers and sailors of the Submarine Arm. The conducts an entry level, year-long basic course which every submariner has to undergo. Six months are spent on training in campus followed by an equal amount of time on board an operational submarine. Following this the sailors are examined by a board of senior submariners and awarded the coveted Dolphin Badge on qualification and commissioned as submariners in the Indian Navy.

Training is also conducted for personnel from foreign navies, thus making it the most sought after submarine training establishments in the whole of South East Asia. Personnel from 25 countries including Vietnam, Bhutan, Myanmar, Nepal, Sri Lanka and South Africa have been trained here.

Apart from training, the unit has been entrusted with the upkeep and running of various facilities of the Eastern Naval Command. The Indian Naval Sports Control Cell (Vizag), Command Auditorium Samudrika, the Command Stadium, KV II in 104 area, Little Angels School in Dolphin Hill, Eastern Naval Command Polo and Equestrian Training Centre (ENPET).

See also 
 Indian navy 
 List of Indian Navy bases
 List of active Indian Navy ships

 Integrated commands and units
 Armed Forces Special Operations Division
 Defence Cyber Agency
 Integrated Defence Staff
 Integrated Space Cell
 Indian Nuclear Command Authority
 Indian Armed Forces
 Special Forces of India

 Other lists
 Strategic Forces Command
 List of Indian Air Force stations
 List of Indian Navy bases
 India's overseas military bases

References 

Vajrabahu